The following is a list of Formula One engine manufacturers. In Formula One motor racing, engine or power unit manufacturers are people or corporate entities which are credited as the make of Formula One engines that have competed or are intended to compete in the FIA Formula One World Championship. A constructor of an engine owns the intellectual  rights to its engine.

2023 engine manufacturers
Correct as of the 
Key:

Former engine manufacturers 

Key: 

Source:

Indianapolis 500 only
Engine manufacturers whose only World Championship participation was in the Indianapolis 500 from 1950 to 1960 when the race was part of the Formula One World Drivers' Championship. All were based in the United States.

 Cadillac
 Chevrolet
 Chrysler
 Cummins
 DeSoto
 Dodge
 Duray
 Mercury
 Miller
 Novi
 Offenhauser
 R Miller
 Sparks
 Studebaker
 Voelker
 Wayne

Notes

References

 
Engines